Syllepte semivialis is a moth in the family Crambidae. It was described by Frederic Moore in 1888. It is found in India (West Bengal, Darjeeling).

References

Moths described in 1888
Moths of Asia
semivialis
Taxa named by Frederic Moore